
Year 862 (DCCCLXII) was a common year starting on Thursday (link will display the full calendar) of the Julian calendar.

Events 
 By place 

 Europe 
 The Varangians (called Rus'), under the leadership of Rurik, a Viking chieftain, arrive (with his brothers, Sineus and Truvor) at Staraya Ladoga. He builds a trade settlement near Novgorod (modern Russia), and founds the Rurik Dynasty. 
 King Lothair II of Lotharingia tries to divorce his wife Teutberga, on trumped-up charges of incest. With the support of his brother, Louis II, the bishops give him permission to remarry during a synod at Aachen.
 March – Viking raiders led by Weland are trapped at Trilbardou Bridge (Northern France), and submit to King Charles the Bald. He and his family accept Christianity (they are baptised) before leaving Neustria.
 Robert the Strong, margrave of Neustria, captures 12 Viking ships and kills their crews. He pays tribute (Danegeld) for keeping the Vikings out of Neustria.
 Carloman, eldest son of King Louis the German, revolts against his father. He is captured, but manages to escape to the Ostmark (or 861).
 First raid of the Hungarians in the Carpathian Basin at the request of Rastislav of Moravia against the East Frankish Kingdom.
 The first written record (according to the Primary Chronicle) is made of the towns of Belozersk and Murom (Northern Russia).
 Viking forces sack Cologne.

 Britain 
 April 13 – King Donald I of Scotland dies after a 4-year reign. He is succeeded by his nephew Constantine I, as ruler of Scotland.
 Áed Findliath is crowned High King of Ireland, after the death of Máel Sechnaill mac Maíl Ruanaid (until 879).

 Abbasid Caliphate 
 June – Caliph al-Muntasir dies after just a half-year reign. He is succeeded by al-Musta'in (son of prince Muhammad), as ruler of the Abbasid Caliphate.
 Ashot I ("the Great") is recognized as the 'Prince of Princes' of Armenia, by the Abbasids.

 China 
 Fan Chuo finishes his Manchu ("Book of the Southern Tribes"), during the Tang Dynasty.

 By topic 

 Religion 
 Constantine the Philosopher (alias Saint Cyril) invents the 42-letter Slavonic alphabet (Cyrillic script) as a tool for converting the Moravians to Christianity (approximate date).

Births 
 June 8 – Xi Zong, emperor of the Tang Dynasty (d. 888)
 Li Cunxin, general of the Tang Dynasty (d. 902)
 Li Cunshen, general of Later Tang (d. 924) 
 Wang Chuzhi, Chinese warlord (d. 922)
 Wang Shenzhi, founder of Min (Ten Kingdoms) (d. 925)
 Xiao Qing, chancellor of Later Liang (d. 930)
 Xu Wen, general and regent of Wu (d. 927)
 Yúnmén Wényǎn, Chinese Zen master (or 864)
 Zhou Ben, general of Wu (d. 938)

Deaths 
 April 13 – Donald I, king of Scotland (b. 812)
 July 2 – Swithun, bishop of Winchester
 September 26 – Musa ibn Musa al-Qasawi, Muslim military leader (b. c. 790)
 Æthelred II, king of Northumbria
 Al-Muntasir, Muslim caliph (b. 837) 
 Bugha al-Kabir, Muslim general
 Lupus Servatus, Frankish abbot (approximate date)
 Máel Sechnaill mac Maíl Ruanaid, High King of Ireland
 Ruarc mac Brain, king of Leinster (Ireland)
 Tahir ibn Abdallah, Muslim governor

References